Rhede may refer to:

 Rhede, a municipality in the district of Borken in the state of North Rhine-Westphalia, Germany
 Rhede, Lower Saxony, a municipality in the Emsland district, Lower Saxony, Germany